The Canadian Battlefield Memorials Restoration Project was a C$30-million  Government of Canada capital project that aimed to restore and rehabilitate Canada's memorial sites in France and Belgium, in order to maintain and present them in a respectful and dignified manner.

Project
Canada's thirteen World War I memorials were erected to honour and remember the achievements and sacrifices of Canadians and Newfoundlanders during the Great War. Collectively, these memorials are symbolic of the Canadians and Newfoundlanders who gave their lives during the First World War, and are physical reminders that their sacrifices and victories must never be forgotten.

In May 2001, the Government of Canada announced the $30-million restoration project. The repair work required to rehabilitate these memorial sites, now an average of 75 years old, is beyond the scope of routine maintenance. The program of work is being carried out in collaboration with Public Works and Government Services Canada, the Commonwealth War Graves Commission and other specialists, consultants and military historians. The work is separated into four project areas, with the restoration of the Canadian National Vimy Memorial being the main priority.

On April 2, 2007 restoration of the last memorial site, the Canadian National Vimy Memorial, was officially completed and the site was re-opened to the public.

Restored memorials

Eight of these memorials stand on notable Canadian battlefields in France and Belgium 
 Vimy Ridge Memorial - Canadian Veterans' Affairs web page
 Bourlon Wood Memorial - Canadian Veterans' Affairs web page
 Courcelette Memorial - Canadian Veterans' Affairs web page
 Dury Memorial - Canadian Veterans' Affairs web page
 Hill 62 Memorial - Canadian Veterans' Affairs web page
 Le Quesnel Memorial - Canadian Veterans' Affairs web page
 Passchendaele Memorial - Canadian Veterans' Affairs web page
 Saint Julien Memorial - Canadian Veterans' Affairs web page

Five other memorials mark places of historical significance to the then Dominion of Newfoundland
 Beaumont-Hamel - Canadian Veterans' Affairs web page
 Gueudecourt (Newfoundland) Memorial - Canadian Veterans' Affairs web page
 Monchy-le-Preux - Canadian Veterans' Affairs web page
 Masnières - Canadian Veterans' Affairs web page
 Courtrai - Canadian Veterans' Affairs web page

References

World War I memorials